The 2019-20 Texas A&M Aggies men's basketball team represented Texas A&M University in the 2019–20 NCAA Division I men's basketball season. The Aggies were coached by first-year head coach Buzz Williams. The Aggies played their home games at Reed Arena in College Station, Texas as members of the Southeastern Conference (SEC). They finished the season 16–14, 10–8 in SEC play to finish in a tie for sixth place. They were set to take on Missouri in the second round of the SEC tournament. However, the remainder of the SEC Tournament was cancelled amid the COVID-19 pandemic.

Previous season
The Aggies finished the season 14–18, 6–12 in SEC play to finish in 11th place. They defeated Vanderbilt in the first round of the SEC tournament before losing to Mississippi State.

On March 15, 2019, the school fired head coach Billy Kennedy after eight seasons. On April 3, the school hired Virginia Tech head coach Buzz Williams as the team's next head coach.

Offseason

Departures

Incoming transfers

2019 recruiting class

2020 recruiting class

Preseason

SEC media poll
The SEC media poll was released on October 15, 2019.

Roster

Schedule and results

|-
!colspan=12 style=|Exhibition

|-
!colspan=12 style=|Regular season

|-
!colspan=12 style=|  SEC tournament
|- style="background:#bbbbbb"
| style="text-align:center"|March 12, 20206:00 pm, SECN
| style="text-align:center"| (7)
| vs. (10) MissouriSecond round
| colspan=5 rowspan=1 style="text-align:center"|Cancelled due to the 2020 coronavirus outbreak
| style="text-align:center"|Bridgestone ArenaNashville, TN
|-

References

Texas A&M Aggies men's basketball seasons
Texas AandM
Texas AandM men's basketball
Texas AandM men's basketball